Demanietta is a genus of freshwater crabs found in Indochinese Peninsula of Southeast Asia. Most of them are found in fast flowing water habitats, giving their common name "waterfall crabs". The genus contains ten described species:
Demanietta manii (Rathbun, 1904)
Demanietta renongensis (Rathbun, 1904)
Demanietta merguensis (Bott, 1966)
Demanietta thagatensi (Rathbun, 1904)
Demanietta tritrungensis (Naiyanetr, 1986)
Demanietta huahin Yeo, Naiyanetr & Ng, 1999
Demanietta khirikhan Yeo, Naiyanetr & Ng, 1999
Demanietta lansak Yeo, Naiyanetr & Ng, 1999
Demanietta nakhons Yeo, Naiyanetr & Ng, 1999
Demanietta suanphung Yeo, Naiyanetr & Ng, 1999

Thaiphusa sirikit was originally describes as Demanietta sirikit

References

Potamoidea